Our Lady, Queen of the Most Holy Rosary Cathedral is a Roman Catholic church located at 2535 Collingwood Boulevard in the Old West End of Toledo, Ohio. The cathedral is the mother church of the 122 parishes in the Roman Catholic Diocese of Toledo.  This cathedral is unique architecturally in that it was designed in the Spanish Plateresque style. It was designed with Toledo's Sister City, Toledo, Spain in mind. Finished in 1931, it was built in the spirit of the great European cathedrals of the Middle Ages.

History

The second bishop of the diocese of Toledo, Ohio, Samuel Stritch (1921-1930), made the final selection of plans approving the architectural drawings of William Perry of Pittsburgh, Pennsylvania. Ground breaking for the cathedral occurred in 1925 and the cornerstone was placed in 1926. The building was structurally completed amidst the Great Depression in 1931 at a cost of $3.25 million.  It was not until October 1940, at the end of the depression, that Bishop Karl Joseph Alter (1931-1950), the third bishop of the diocese, dedicated the church as Our Lady, Queen of the Most Holy Rosary Cathedral.

Architecture

The cathedral has a basilica floor plan and is constructed of Massachusetts granite with Indiana limestone accents.  The main facade has a single entry that is recessed in a barrel-vault arch framed by carved limestone details.  Above the doorway is a statue of the Virgin Mary in a carved niche.  Above the statue is a  rose window with limestone tracery set into a larger arch.  The window depicts scenes from the life of Mary and was financed through the donation of pennies by children throughout the diocese.  Framing the entry are two octagonal towers which bear carvings of Sts. Peter and Paul on either side of the rose window.  Above the window, on the pediment, are the diocesan coat of arms.  The entire facade is surmounted by a crucifix and a frieze which encircles the exterior depicts notable events in the history of the church.

The nave of the cathedral is topped by a barrel vault that is divided into seven bays and elaborately painted with figures from both the Old and New Testaments executed by artist Felix Lieftuchter. The paintings use the Keim process which utilizes mineral paints that does not evaporate or interfere with acoustics. Along the nave are altars dedicated to St. Theresa of Lisieux and Our Lady of Perpetual Help.

The main altar is carved from black Marquina Florido marble, imported from Spain, and, before the renovation, was covered with an oak baldachin supported by marble columns.  The pulpit is carved from white oak by German artisan August Schmidt.  Around the apse are statues of the eight authors of the New Testament.  Each statue stands under a carved flèche.

Ernest M. Skinner organ

The cathedral houses a large 4 manual Ernest M. Skinner pipe organ, their opus 820 (1930). The instrument was personally finished by Ernest Skinner, and formally dedicated in 1931 by Palmer Christian, professor of organ at the University of Michigan. It contains 75 stops and 76 ranks (sets) of pipes, totaling 4,916 pipes. These pipes range in length from 7 inches to over 32 feet.

According to the Cathedral Music page on the Holy Rosary Website this fine Skinner organ represents the culmination of his career and reflects the influences of Willis, Cavaille-Coll, and G. Donald Harrison.

The instrument remains virtually unaltered from its original installation, and stands as one of the crown musical jewels of the cathedral, and of the City of Toledo.

In 2009 the instrument received an historical citation from the Organ Historical Society.

Its sister organ resides in the peristyle concert hall in the Toledo Museum of Art.

Restoration
In 2000, the cathedral parish completed a restoration of the church interior which removed many decades of soot from coal-fired and oil-fired boilers to return the original brilliance and luster of the mosaic works of art. In the 2000s, the parish and diocese re-landscaped the grounds, and re-stoned the paths to the entrances of the building to match the theme, style and color of the stonework on the façade. Around the same time, the parking lot received gates and stone corner-pieces matching the paths and the building. The church also bought a second lot across the street.

Dimensions
Overall Length - 
Overall Width - 
Height from floor to peak -
Normal Seating - 1400
Rose Window -  in diameter
Tabernacle height -

See also

List of churches in the Roman Catholic Diocese of Toledo
List of Catholic cathedrals in the United States
List of cathedrals in the United States
Churches Named for the Rosary

References

External links
 Official Cathedral Site
 Roman Catholic Diocese of Toledo Official Site

Roman Catholic cathedrals in Ohio
Culture of Toledo, Ohio
Roman Catholic churches in Toledo, Ohio
Tourist attractions in Toledo, Ohio